Aphragmophora is an order of sagittodieans in the phylum Chaetognatha.

Families
Bathybelidae Bieri, 1989
Krohnittidae Tokioka, 1965
Pterokrohniidae Bieri, 1991
Pterosagittidae Tokioka, 1965
Sagittidae Claus & Grobben, 1905

See also
Taxonomy of invertebrates (Brusca & Brusca, 2003)

References

External links
.
.
 Eric Fauré, Roxane-Marie Barthélémy: Specific mitochondrial ss-tRNAs in phylum Chaetognatha. In: Journal of Entomology and Zoology Studies 7(3), April 2019, pp. 304–315. hal-02130653

Chaetognatha
Protostome orders